Granite Quarry School, also known as Schuford Memorial Elementary School and Granite Quarry Elementary School, is a historic school complex located at Granite Quarry, Rowan County, North Carolina.  The main school building was built in 1933, and is a one-story, "H"-shaped building sheathed in granite.  It has a side gable roof with shed dormers and a pedimented entrance portico. Connected to the main building by open, covered walkways are the cafeteria (1956) designed by Leslie Boney and a classroom building (1960).  It was originally built for African-American students and continued to operate until 1968 when its students were integrated into other county schools.

It was listed on the National Register of Historic Places in 2001.

References

African-American history of North Carolina
School buildings on the National Register of Historic Places in North Carolina
School buildings completed in 1933
Buildings and structures in Rowan County, North Carolina
National Register of Historic Places in Rowan County, North Carolina